The city planning commission for New Orleans divided the city into 13 planning districts and 73 distinct neighborhoods in 1980. Although initially in the study 68 neighborhoods were designated, and later increased by the City Planning Commission to 76 in October 2001 based in census data, most planners, neighborhood associations, researchers, and journalists have since widely adopted the 73 as the number and can even trace the number back to the early 1900s. 
While most of these assigned boundaries match with traditional local designations, some others differ from common traditional use. This is a result of the city planning commission's wish to divide the city into sections for governmental planning and zoning purposes without crossing United States census tract boundaries. While most of the listed names have been in common use by New Orleanians for generations, some designated names are rarely heard outside the planning commission's usage.

East Bank

French Quarter / CBD, Warehouse (Districts 1a & 1b) 

 French Quarter also called Vieux Carré
 Central Business District

Central City / Garden District Area (District 2)
Central City
East Riverside
Garden District
Irish Channel
Lower Garden District
Milan
St. Thomas
Touro
Faubourg Lafayette
Faubourg Livaudais

Uptown / Carrollton Area (District 3)
Audubon, also known as University
Black Pearl
Broadmoor
Dixon
East Carrollton
Freret
Hollygrove
Leonidas, also called West Carrollton
Fontainebleau, also called Marlyville
Uptown
West Riverside

Mid-City Area (District 4) 
Bayou St. John
B.W. Cooper, formerly Calliope Projects
Fairgrounds
Faubourg St. John
Gert Town  
Zion City, New Orleans
Iberville Development  (note: This area was built on the site of the infamous Storyville neighborhood.)
Mid-City
Parkview
Seventh Ward
St. Bernard Projects
Tremé/Lafitte
Tulane/Gravier

Lakeview Area (District 5) 
City Park
Lakeshore/Lake Vista
Lakeview
Lakewood
Country Club Gardens
Navarre
West End

Gentilly Area (District 6) 
Dillard
Filmore
Gentilly Terrace
Gentilly Woods
Lake Terrace/Lake Oaks
Milneburg
Pontchartrain Park
St. Anthony

Marigny, Bywater, St. Claude, St. Roch, Desire (District 7) 
Bywater
Desire Area
New Desire Projects: Abundance Square
Faubourg Marigny
Florida Area
Florida Projects
St. Claude
Musicians' Village
St. Roch

Lower Ninth Ward Area/Holy Cross (District 8)  
Holy Cross
Lower Ninth Ward

Eastern New Orleans

New Orleans East (District 9) 
Little Woods, also called Edge Lake
Pines Village
Plum Orchard
Read Boulevard East
Read Boulevard West
West Lake Forest

Village de L'Est (District 10) 
Village de L'Est
Michoud

Venetian Isles / Lake Catherine (District 11) 
Viavant/Venetian Isles
Lake Catherine

West Bank

Algiers Area (District 12)
Algiers Point
U.S. Naval Support Area
Aurora, also called Old Aurora; includes Huntlee Village and Walnut Bend
Behrman, New Orleans
Fischer Housing Development
McDonogh, formerly called McDonoghville
Tall Timbers / Brechtel
New Aurora (Includes River Park, Cut Off, and Lower Coast Algiers)

English Turn Area (District 13)
English Turn

Latitude and longitude of neighborhoods

Other divisions and designations 
There are a number of traditional and historic divisions of New Orleans which may still be commonly heard of in conversation, but which do not correspond with New Orleans City Planning Commission designations.

The 19th-century division of the city along the axis of Canal Street into downtown and uptown is a prime example. Various areas of the modern city which were separate towns in the past, such as Algiers and Carrollton, continue to be spoken of – but now as neighborhoods. The large area to the east of the Industrial Canal and north of the Mississippi River-Gulf Outlet Canal, little developed until the last third of the 20th century, is often referred to as Eastern New Orleans (or "New Orleans East," although that term usually refers to a smaller subset of the area).

Another example is the use of the Wards as means of neighborhood identification for the city's residents. Originally created in 1805 with only 7 wards designated, there now are 17 in total. Socially among locals the wards are divided by the ones located "uptown" and the ones located "downtown". Later in the 1980's there was a rise in the use of them as cultural identifiers with the emergence of bounce music and the recognition of the different dialects within them.

See also
 Buildings and architecture of New Orleans
 Downtown New Orleans
 Uptown New Orleans
 Wards of New Orleans
 Housing Authority of New Orleans
 List of streets of New Orleans

References

External links
City of NOLA Data Portal Neighborhood boundary data for these neighborhoods 
NOLAhoods.com This site showcases many of the 85+ distinct neighborhoods within New Orleans, with a comprehensive calendar and current news feeds.
Greater New Orleans Community Data Center This site produces New Orleans profiles based on the City Planning Commission's New Orleans neighborhood breakdown.
New Orleans Neighborhood Guide

 
New Orleans